Pralamba is an asura killed by Balarama in Hindu mythology. According to the pertinent legend, the asura assumed the guise of a cowherd and attempted to join Krishna and Balarama in a game of jumping, whose conditions dictated that the loser carry the victor on his back. Pralamba promptly lost, and was forced to carry Balarama on his back. However, Pralamba then transformed himself into a larger form and tried to run off with Balarama still clinging to him, which would have happened had Krishna not stopped him with a speech reprimanding him and asking him to suspend his powers. Balarama then clung to Pralamba, squeezing him with his knees, striking him simultaneously on the head and face with his fists, assaulting both his eyes. The asura, vomiting blood from his mouth, and having his brain bashed through the skull, descended to the earth and was slain. References to Pralamba are available in the Vishnu Purana and the Mahabharata.

In Literature 
The Vishnu Purana describes the prowess of the asura, slain after the defeat of the asura Dhenuka:

See also 

 List of Asuras
 Keshi
 Dhenuka

References

A Dictionary of Hindu Mythology & Religion by John Dowson

Danavas